Gwenllian (or Gwenllïan) (Welsh, a combination of gwen "fair, blessed, white" and llian "flaxen") was the name of several ladies who lived in medieval Wales.  The two best known have, for different reasons, become symbols of Welsh patriotism and/or independence. It is also the name of a song by prominent Welsh songwriter Meic Stevens and Anglesey rock band Calfari.

Gwenllian ferch Gruffydd (1097–1136) Her patriotic revolt and subsequent death in battle at Kidwelly Castle contributed to the Great Revolt of 1136
Gwenllian ferch Llywelyn (1282–1337) The only child of Llywelyn ap Gruffudd, the last native Prince of Wales

Welsh feminine given names